McLean (preliminary names Tysons East, Tysons–McLean) is a  Washington Metro station in Fairfax County, Virginia, on the Silver Line. The station is located in Tysons, with a McLean postal address. It began operation on July 26, 2014.

Station layout

Access to McLean station is provided by two entrances, one on each side of SR 123.

McLean has a simple island platform setup with two tracks. While there was some controversy about whether to build the rail through Tysons below ground or on elevated tracks, McLean is also elevated. No permanent car parking is planned at the station. A bus station and kiss-and-ride lot are on the southern side of SR 123. Bike parking is also available.

History
This station was one of 19 WMATA stations closed due to the 2020 coronavirus pandemic. Shuttle buses began serving the station on June 28, 2020.

This station reopened beginning on August 16, 2020, when trains were able to bypass East Falls Church station.

Location

McLean station is located in the northeast section of Tysons, at the northwest corner of the intersection of SR 123/Dolley Madison Boulevard and Scotts Crossing Road. This area is bordered on the south by SR 123, on the west by Exit 46A-B of the I-495/Capital Beltway, and by Exit 19A-B of SR 267. Virginia Department of Transportation (VDOT) traffic counts show heavy usage of all three roads in the area, with around 122,000 cars per day using SR 267 north of Exit 18; of these, about one-third continue on the Dulles Toll Road with the other two-thirds (67,000) using the Beltway. In addition, 44,000 cars use Dolley Madison Boulevard each day.

The station is located 2 miles (3.2 km) west of downtown McLean, Virginia. McLean itself took the name of the McLean station, of the former Great Falls and Old Dominion Railroad interurban trolley line, that the town grew around. Fairfax County's long-range transportation plan contains no plans for returning mass transit to the town of McLean, making it an appropriate name for the nearest Silver Line station.

The station serves the headquarters of Capital One, several intelligence agency facilities of the Federal government of the United States, various government contractors, and local residents. Tysons is nearby with major shopping malls.

Station facilities
2 station entrances (each side of SR 123)
Pedestrian bridge crossing SR 123
Bus dropoff/pickup
Kiss & Ride
56 bike parking spaces

References

External links

McLean, Virginia
Railway stations in the United States opened in 2014
Stations on the Silver Line (Washington Metro)
Transportation in Fairfax County, Virginia
Washington Metro stations in Virginia
2014 establishments in Virginia
Tysons, Virginia